Goose Lake, also known as Lone Pine, is a hamlet in northwest Alberta, Canada within Woodlands County.

Goose Lake is often referred to as Lone Pine due to the location of its former post office at the former Lone Pine Store, which was located near the intersection of Highway 658 and Township Road 614B—the road that provides access to the hamlet and the Goose Lake Campground.

Demographics 
The population of Goose Lake according to Alberta Transportation's Basic Municipal Transportation Grant funding program is 11.

See also 
List of communities in Alberta
List of hamlets in Alberta

References 

Hamlets in Alberta
Woodlands County